Stephen George Peek  (July 30, 1914 - September 20, 1991), was a Major League Baseball pitcher who played in  with the New York Yankees. He batted left and right and threw right-handed. Peek had a 4-2 record, with a 5.06 ERA, in 17 games, in his one year career.

Peek served in the military during World War II.
 
He was born in Springfield, Massachusetts and died in Syracuse, New York.

References

External links

1914 births
1991 deaths
Major League Baseball pitchers
Baseball players from Springfield, Massachusetts
New York Yankees players
United States Army personnel of World War II
St. Lawrence Saints baseball players